Athelstan Charles Ethelwulf Long CMG CBE (2 January 1919 – 31 July 2019) was a British colonial administrator. He was commissioned into the Royal Artillery on the 24th February 1940. He was the Administrator, then Governor of the Cayman Islands from 1968 to 1972. He was the son of the writer Marjorie Bowen (pseudonym) and her second husband Arthur Leonard Long.

References 

1919 births
2019 deaths
Companions of the Order of St Michael and St George
Commanders of the Order of the British Empire
Governors of the Cayman Islands
People educated at Westminster School, London
Alumni of Brasenose College, Oxford
Royal Artillery officers
Indian Political Service officers
British Army personnel of World War II
Administrators in British Burma
Colonial Administrative Service officers
Fellows of the Royal Asiatic Society
Fellows of the Royal Geographical Society
British World War II prisoners of war